Cyphoderus is a genus of elongate-bodied springtails in the family Paronellidae. There are more than 20 described species in Cyphoderus.

Species
These 21 species belong to the genus Cyphoderus:

 Cyphoderus agnotus Boerner, 1906
 Cyphoderus albinus Nicolet, 1842
 Cyphoderus assimilis Börner, 1906
 Cyphoderus bidenticulatus Parona, 1888
 Cyphoderus caetetus
 Cyphoderus canariensis da Gama, 1988
 Cyphoderus gisini Gruia, 1967
 Cyphoderus inaequalis Pack
 Cyphoderus jugoslavicus Denis, 1933
 Cyphoderus khaochakanus Jantarit, Satasook & Deharveng, 2014
 Cyphoderus komareki Rusek, 1961
 Cyphoderus manuneru Bernard, Soto-Adames & Wynne, 2015
 Cyphoderus mucrominimus Oliveira, Alves & Zeppelini, 2017
 Cyphoderus mucrostrimenus Oliveira, Alves & Zeppelini, 2017
 Cyphoderus orientalis Folsom
 Cyphoderus paralbinus Jacquemart, 1980
 Cyphoderus pinnatus Folsom
 Cyphoderus similis Folsom, 1927
 Cyphoderus songkhlaensis Jantarit, Satasook & Deharveng, 2014
 Cyphoderus squamidives Silvestri, 1917
 Cyphoderus veneris Denis, 1923

References

Further reading

External links

 

Collembola
Articles created by Qbugbot